Djeneba Bamba is a Malian association football player born on February 5, 1983, in Bamako. Djeneba Bamba plays the position of a goalkeeper. She plays for RC Saint-Étienne and the Mali Women National team. She has been active since 2003. As of 2008, Djeneba Bamba has been with Super Lionnes d'Hamdalaye foobal club.

Career
Bamba started her career in Mali with the US Djicoroni. In the summer of 2004, Djeneba Bamba moved from Mali to the reserve of the Racing Club Saint -Étienne, where she met compatriot Aïssata Coulibaly. In the summer of 2006 Bamba was promoted to the Division 1 Féminine team of RC Saint -Étienne and gave on September 10 her professional debut against FC Vendenheim. After four years playing for the RC Saint-Etienne had played, she returned to her home, and since then has been at Super Lionnes d'Hamdalaye in her native Mali under contract. Bamba belongs since 2003 to the Malian national football team of women [2] and in 2006 took on the African Cup of women in Nigeria part. Her awards include the Vice-Champion of Division 2 with the Racing Club of Saint-Étienne in 2007.

References 

1983 births
Living people
Sportspeople from Bamako
Malian women's footballers
Women's association football goalkeepers
Mali women's international footballers
Malian expatriate footballers
Malian expatriate sportspeople in France
Expatriate women's footballers in France
21st-century Malian people